The Communist Party of Venezuela (PCV) is a communist party and the oldest continuously existing party in Venezuela. It was the main leftist political party in Venezuela from its foundation in 1931 until its split into rival factions in 1971. The PCV opposes the government of Nicolás Maduro.

History
The PCV was founded in 1931 as a clandestine organization during the military dictatorship of Juan Vicente Gómez. The PCV became the Venezuelan affiliate of the Communist International. A forerunner of the PCV, the Venezuelan Revolutionary Party, had been founded in exile in Mexico in 1926 and attempted a rebellion in Venezuela in 1929.

The PCV remained an illegal organization until 1941, when it entered into an alliance with the progressive military regime of Isaías Medina Angarita, following orders from Comintern for communist parties throughout the world to support governments that aided the allied war effort. During this time it published the weekly newspaper ¡Aquí Está!. The PCV was outlawed during the conservative military dictatorship of Marcos Pérez Jiménez (1948–1958), when it played a key role in organizing the clandestine resistance to the regime, alongside activist from the (also banned) party Democratic Action.

In 1952, despite remaining an illegal organization, PCV provided key support to the non-communist leftist party URD in elections organized by the military regime to legitimize its rule. When URD's election victory became apparent, the military ordered the ballot counting process stopped and refused to accept its defeat at the hands of the communist-supported opposition. The episode shifted the balance of power in the military from relative moderates to the hard-line faction led by Marcos Pérez Jiménez, which substantially stepped up efforts to repress the clandestine opposition.

In 1958, the three main non-communist opposition parties (Accion Democratica, COPEI and URD) purposely excluded PCV from the power-sharing Puntofijo Pact that would underpin the country's transition to democracy.

Appearing on a Venezuelan election ballot for the first time in the 1958 election, PCV backed the candidacy of URD's Wolfgang Larrazábal and received 3.2% of the vote (84,451 votes), contributing towards Larrazábal's total of 34.88%. The figure understates the party's influence in Venezuelan politics at the time, which stemmed less from its mass support than from its highly disciplined internal organization, including many full-time party organizers, and its ideological and financial ties to the Soviet Union.

In the early 1960s, inspired by the Cuban Revolution, the party became much more radical and launched a guerrilla war against the newly elected AD government led by Rómulo Betancourt, causing it to be outlawed once more. The PCV guerrilla effort was unable to mobilize substantial support from the Venezuelan peasantry, which largely supported Betancourt's reformism, and was unable to mount a serious military challenge to the new regime. Disillusioned with the guerrilla experience, the majority of PCV members split away from the party in 1971 to enter electoral politics as part of the reformist Movement toward Socialism (MAS). At the same time, a much smaller group of activists split off to form the trade-union based party La Causa Radical, better known as Causa R, a forerunner of today's Patria Para Todos party. Remaining communist fighters were later given a general amnesty by President Rafael Caldera as part of his "pacificacion" process.

In the following years, the PCV became a marginal force in Venezuelan politics. The party received 0.7% of the national vote in the 1973 elections, 0.5% in the 1978 election, 1% in 1983, and 0.3% in both the 1988 and 1993 elections: with its high-water mark coming in 1983, with 67,681 votes.

In the 1993 presidential elections, the PCV endorsed Rafael Caldera, a member of the Convergencia alliance. PCV broke with President Caldera in 1996.

During the Bolivarian era
In the presidential elections of 1998, the PCV backed Hugo Chávez adding 81,979 votes (1.25% of the national vote) to Chávez's total of 3,673,685 votes. In the 2006 presidential election, the PCV ticket received 2.9% of the National vote, contributing a haul of 342,227 to Chávez's total of 7,309,080 votes. These results make PCV the 4th largest party in the Chávez coalition.

In the presidential elections of 2012, PCV again backed Chavez. Its ticket contributed 3.28% of the National vote, making PCV the second largest party in the Chavez coalition. The PCV won 1.6% in the 2013 municipal elections, up from 1.4% in the 2008 municipal elections.

The PCV has articulated its belief that the transition to socialism in Venezuela will be slow and evolutionary. The party was a small but vocal part of the Chávez governing coalition.

Following the December 2005 legislative election, eight PCV members were elected as deputies to the National Assembly:
 Roberto Hernández
 Diluvina Cabello
 Germán Ferrer
 Oscar Figuera
 Edgar Lucena
 Chiche Manaure
 Omar Marcano
 David Velásquez

In the 2018 Venezuelan presidential election, the PCV endorsed Nicolas Maduro.

In August 2020, PCV distanced itself from Maduro, with party leader Óscar Figuera affirming that the party would not support President Maduro if he failed to change his policies regarding Venezuela's economy. In September 2020, Figuera denounced Maduro, claiming that the PCV was being disproportionately attacked by Maduro's government.

Organization

Press
The PCV publishes Debate Abierto (Open Debate), edited by Dr Carolus Wimmer, and Tribuna Popular (Popular Tribune). The youth wing of PCV is Juventud Comunista de Venezuela (Communist Youth of Venezuela).

References

External links

 
 Manifesto of PCV (1931)
 Communiques concerning the coup of 1945

 
Political parties in Venezuela
Communist parties in the Americas
Far-left political parties in Venezuela
International Meeting of Communist and Workers Parties